4,5-MDO-DMT, or 4,5-methylenedioxy-N,N-dimethyltryptamine, is a lesser-known psychedelic drug.  It is the 4,5-methylenedioxy analog of DMT. 4,5-MDO-DMT was first synthesized by Alexander Shulgin, though in his book TiHKAL it was not tested to determine its psychoactive effects. 4,5-MDO-DMT has been the subject of limited subsequent testing; with behavioral disruption studies performed in male rats indicating that its hallucinogenic potency is less than that of 4,5-MDO-DiPT but greater than that of 5,6-MDO-DiPT.

References

External links 
 4,5-MDO-DMT Entry in TIHKAL
 4,5-MDO-DMT Entry in TiHKAL • info

Psychedelic tryptamines